Myriopholis blanfordi, also known commonly as Blanford's worm snake and the Sindh thread snake, is a species of harmless blind snake in the family Leptotyphlopidae. The species is native to South Asia and Iran, and possibly further west in the Middle East. There are no recognized subspecies.

Etymology
M. blanfordi is named after English naturalist William Thomas Blanford (1832–1905), member of the Geological Survey of India.

Subspecies
There are no subspecies of M. blanfordi that are recognized as being valid.

Geographic range
M. blanfordi is found in India, Pakistan, Afghanistan, southern Iran, and possibly the Arabian Peninsula. The type locality given is "Sind" [Punjab, India].

Reproduction
M. blanfordi is oviparous.

References

Further reading

Adalsteinsson SA, Branch WR, Trape S, Vitt LJ, Hedges SB (2009). "Molecular phylogeny, classification, and biogeography of snakes of the family Leptotyphlopidae (Reptilia, Squamata)". Zootaxa 2244: 1–50. (Myriopholis blanfordi, new combination).
Boulenger GA (1890). The Fauna of British India, Including Ceylon and Burma. Reptilia and Batrachia. London: Secretary of State for India in Council. (Taylor & Francis, printers). xviii + 541 pp. (Glauconia blanfordii, new species, p. 243, Figure 72).
Boulenger GA (1893). Catalogue of the Snakes in the British Museum (Natural History). Volume I., Containing the Families ... Glauconiidæ ... London: Trustees of the British Museum (Natural History). (Taylor and Francis, printers). xiii + 448 pp. + Plates I-XXVIII. (Glauconia blanfordii, p. 66).
Hahn DE, Wallach V (1998). "Comments on the systematics of Old World Leptotyphlops (Serpentes: Leptotyphlopidae), with description of a new species". Hamadryad 23: 50-62.
Latifi M (1991). The Snakes of Iran. Oxford, Ohio: Society for the Study of Amphibians and Reptiles. 156 pp. .
Smith MA (1943). The Fauna of British India, Ceylon and Burma, Including the Whole of the Indo-Chinese Sub-region. Reptilia and Amphibia. Vol. III.—Serpentes. London: Secretary of State for India. (Taylor and Francis, printers). xii + 583 pp. (Leptotyphlops blanfordi, p. 61).

blanfordii
Snakes of Asia
Reptiles of Afghanistan
Reptiles of India
Reptiles of Iran
Reptiles of Pakistan
Reptiles described in 1890
Taxa named by George Albert Boulenger